"Rescue Me" is a song by British group Ultra. It was released on 4 January 1999 on in the United Kingdom through East West Records as the fourth single from their debut album, Ultra (1999). It was the group's first and only top ten single.

B-side "Somebody" is a cover of the Depeche Mode song and was released in limited edition only.

Track listing
 CD1 (EW193CD1)
 "Rescue Me"  (Ultra Radio Edit)  - 3:45
 "Rescue Me"  (Steelworks 12'' Mix)  - 5:47
 "Rescue Me"  (Orchestral Mix)  - 4:27

CD2 (EW193CD2)
 "Rescue Me"  (Ultra Radio Edit)  - 3:45
 "Somebody" - 3:35
 CD_Rom Video "Rescue Me" - 3:39

Weekly charts

Release history

References

1999 singles
1998 songs
Ultra (British band) songs
East West Records singles